WFMC (730 AM) is an Urban Gospel radio station licensed to Goldsboro, North Carolina, United States.  The station is currently owned by New Age Communications, Inc.

References

External links

FMC
Gospel radio stations in the United States